Bilecik University  is a university located in Bilecik, Turkey. It was established in 2007.

References

External links
Official Website

Universities and colleges in Turkey
Educational institutions established in 2007
State universities and colleges in Turkey
2007 establishments in Turkey
Bilecik Province